Marquice O'Brien Williams (born November 8, 1985) is an American football coach who is the special teams coordinator for the Atlanta Falcons of the National Football League (NFL). He previously served as an assistant coach for the Detroit Lions, Houston Texans and Chicago Bears.

Early years
Williams is a native of Fresno, California and played as a defensive back at Fresno City College and at the University of Mary. In 2005, Williams earned his associates degree from Fresno City College and in 2008, he earned his bachelor's degree in university studies from the University of Mary.

Coaching career

Winona State
In 2010, Williams began his coaching career as an outside linebackers coach and assistant special teams coach at Winona State University.

Central Oklahoma
In 2011, Williams joined the University of Central Oklahoma as their linebackers coach.

South Dakota
In 2012, Williams was hired by the University of South Dakota to be their defensive line coach and community relations liaison. In 2015, Williams was given an additional role as special teams coordinator.

Chicago Bears
In 2013, while still coaching with the University of South Dakota, Williams joined the Bill Walsh NFL diversity coaching fellowship with the Chicago Bears.

Detroit Lions
In 2015, Williams joined the Detroit Lions as a member of the Bill Walsh NFL diversity coaching fellowship program. He served as a coaching intern for linebackers and special teams.

San Diego / Los Angeles Chargers
In 2016, Williams was hired by the San Diego Chargers as an assistant special teams coach under head coach Mike McCoy. In 2017, Williams was retained by the Los Angeles Chargers under head coach Anthony Lynn and served as a defensive assistant for the Chargers in 2018.

Detroit Lions (second stint)
In 2019, Williams was hired by the Detroit Lions as their assistant special teams coach under head coach Matt Patricia.

Atlanta Falcons
On January 21, 2021, Williams was hired by the Atlanta Falcons as their special teams coordinator under head coach Arthur Smith.

Personal life
Williams is married to his wife, Elizabeth, and they have four children together.

References

External links
 Atlanta Falcons profile
 South Dakota profile
 Winona State profile

Detroit Lions coaches
Living people
Atlanta Falcons coaches
Chicago Bears coaches
San Diego Chargers coaches
Los Angeles Chargers coaches
African-American coaches of American football
University of Mary alumni
People from Fresno, California
Sportspeople from Fresno, California
South Dakota Coyotes football coaches
Winona State Warriors football coaches
Central Oklahoma Bronchos football coaches
Wikipedia pages semi-protected against vandalism
Year of birth missing (living people)
21st-century African-American people
Mary Marauders football players